Eliasson or Elíasson is a surname. Notable people with the surname include:

Ásgeir Elíasson (1949–2007), football manager and coach of the Iceland national football team
Anders Eliasson (1947–2013), Swedish composer
Dan Eliasson (born 1961), Former Swedish National Police Commissioner and former head of Swedish Civil Contingencies Agency
Emma Eliasson (born 1989), ice hockey player
Gyrðir Elíasson (born 1964), Icelandic author
Håkan Eliasson (born 1952), Swedish mathematician
Jan Eliasson (born 1940), Swedish diplomat and Social Democratic politician
Lars Eliasson (1914–2002), Swedish politician
Lena Eliasson (born 1981), Swedish orienteering and ski-orienteering competitor
Marthe Eliasson (born 1969), Norwegian team handball player and Olympic medalist
Mattias Eliasson (born 1975), Swedish golfer
Nökkvi Elíasson (born 1966), Icelandic photographer
Olafur Eliasson (born 1967), Danish-Icelandic artist known for sculptures and large-scale installation art
Sigurlaugur Elíasson (born 1957), Icelandic artist and poet
 Niclas Eliasson

See also
List of exhibitions by Ólafur Elíasson